Trinity Academy may refer to:

India
Trinity Academy, Namakkal, Tamil Nadu, India

United Kingdom
Trinity Academy Bradford, West Yorkshire, England
Trinity Academy, Bristol, England
Trinity Academy, Brixton, London, England
Trinity Academy Cathedral, Wakefield, West Yorkshire, England
Trinity Academy, Edinburgh, Scotland
Trinity Academy, Halifax, West Yorkshire, England
Trinity Academy, Thorne, Doncaster, England

United States
Trinity Academy (Kansas), Wichita, Kansas, United States
Trinity Academy (Portland, Oregon), Portland, Oregon, United States
Trinity Academy (Raleigh, North Carolina), Raleigh, North Carolina, United States
Trinity Academy (Wisconsin), Pewaukee, Wisconsin, United States